In mathematics, the rotation number is an invariant of homeomorphisms of the circle.

History

It was first defined by Henri Poincaré in 1885, in relation to the precession of the perihelion of a planetary orbit. Poincaré later proved a theorem characterizing the existence of periodic orbits in terms of rationality of the rotation number.

Definition 

Suppose that  is an orientation-preserving homeomorphism of the circle  Then  may be lifted to a homeomorphism  of the real line, satisfying

 

for every real number  and every integer .

Henri Poincaré proved that the limit exists and is independent of the choice of the starting point .

Example 

If f is a rotation by 2πθ (where 0≤θ<1), then

 

then its rotation number is θ (cf Irrational rotation).

Properties 

 

for a monotone continuous map  of the circle into itself (not necessarily homeomorphic) then  and  have the same rotation numbers. It was used by Poincaré and Arnaud Denjoy for topological classification of homeomorphisms of the circle. There are two distinct possibilities.

Moreover, every forward orbit of  converges to a periodic orbit.
Then  has no periodic orbits (this follows immediately by considering a periodic point  of ). There are two subcases.

 There exists a dense orbit. In this case  is topologically conjugate to the irrational rotation by the angle  and all orbits are dense. Denjoy proved that this possibility is always realized when  is twice continuously differentiable.
 There exists a Cantor set  invariant under .

The rotation number is continuous when viewed as a map from the group of homeomorphisms (with  topology) of the circle into the circle.

See also

 Circle map
 Denjoy diffeomorphism
 Poincaré section
 Poincaré recurrence
 Poincaré–Bendixson theorem

References

 , also SciSpace for smaller file size in pdf ver 1.3
 Sebastian van Strien, Rotation Numbers and Poincaré's Theorem (2001)

External links 
 
 Weisstein, Eric W. "Map Winding Number". From MathWorld--A Wolfram Web Resource.

Fixed points (mathematics)
Dynamical systems